This list includes revolutionary organizations aimed at liberating and unifying Greek-inhabited territories into the historical national state of Greece.

See also
Greek War of Independence
Megali Idea
Enosis
Northern Epirus
Republic of Pontus

 
Revolutionary organisations